is a Japanese manga series by Ryousuke Asakura. It has been serialized in Square Enix's shōnen manga magazine Monthly Shōnen Gangan since December 2015. The manga is licensed in North America by Yen Press. An anime television series adaptation by Hoods Entertainment aired from October to December 2019.

Plot
Ever since he was a child, Takuma Akutsu had a scary face. He was shunned by his classmates and only attracted bad attention, such as the likes of gangsters and thugs. As a result, he developed social anxiety, unable to properly converse with people. This fact and his scary face only proceeded to exacerbate his bad reputation and he was known as a demon. One day, Takuma saves Natsuki and receives a revelation from Odin, the lord of Asgard, that the world will end soon and that it is on Takuma's shoulders to save the world. To help him with his mission, Odin sends his nine daughters, the nine Valkyries, down to Midgard/Earth. Odin then gives him his mission: he is to prove that love will save the world as it is said that the source of a maiden's strength is love.

Characters

Main character

 Takuma Akutsu is an einheri deemed by Odin and is the lover of the nine Valkyrie sisters. With a strong and scary build but a timid personality, Takuma, at first, is not a good lover. However, he trains himself to become a fitting einheri. He holds Mistilteinn, one of only three Tears of Yggdrasil, given to him by Odin himself.

Saotome family

 The eldest of the nine Saotome sisters and the captain of the Valkyries, Ichika Saotome is the Valkyrie of the Spear, Brunhilde. She does not approve of Takuma as the lover of her and her sisters for a good part of the first arcs, although this attitude changes during a significant battle.

The second of the nine Saotome sisters, Futaba Saotome is the Valkyrie of the Castle, Gerhilde. Back in Asgard, Futaba had the nickname of Her Majesty, the Queen despite being arguably the weakest of the nine. She takes care of most of the housework when she and her siblings invaded Takuma's home.

The third of the nine Saotome sisters, Misa Saotome is the Valkryie of the String, Ortlinde. A tomboyish character, Misa is looked up to by her younger siblings as a so-called "romance master" despite having no such experience herself.

 The fourth of the nine Saotome sisters, Shino Saotome is the Valkryie of the Armor, Waltraute. She is a recluse, rarely showing her person, let alone her face. She is the Valkyrie in charge of the barriers around Takuma's resident to prevent the minions of the evil god from finding the sanctuary of the valkyries.

The fifth of the nine Saotome sisters, Itsuyo Saotome is the Valkyrie of the Chain, Schwertleite. She had transferred to Takuma's school at the beginning of the second term and became the student council president.

The sixth of the nine Saotome sisters, Mutsumi Saotome is the Valkyrie of the Wing, Helmwige. She is a popular idol who rarely attends school due to her work (the idol work was a job forced onto her by her sisters to allow for more opportunities for Val Love).

The seventh of the nine Saotome sisters, Natsuki Saotome is the Valkyrie of the Blade, Siegrune, and is currently the highest-leveled Valkyrie out of the nine. She is a student at Takuma's school whose popularity warrants fan clubs even outside of her own school.

 The eighth of the nine Saotome sisters, Yakumo Saotome is the Valkyrie of the Sound, Grimgerde. Out of all of the sisters, she probably hates Takuma the most, constantly teasing him although this is because she has unnaturally superhuman hearing and Takuma's constantly pounding heart annoys her.

 The youngest of the nine Saotome sisters, Kururi Saotome is the Valkyrie of the Cannon, Rossweisse. She has a love for robots and spends most of her time building and creating random items. However, due to her powers, Midgard, that is, Earth, materials, don't work as well as Asgardian materials and most of the items she makes doesn't last long.

Others

A student council secretary, Tohru Inukai is the human host of "The Fang", Garm.

Media

Manga
Written and illustrated by Ryousuke Asakura, Val × Love has been serialized in Square Enix's shōnen manga magazine Monthly Shōnen Gangan since December 12, 2015. The chapters are being collected and released in the tankōbon format by Square Enix. As of August 2022, fifteen tankōbon volumes has been released. The manga is licensed in North America by Yen Press.  The series will end serialization on March 10, 2023 and with the release of its sixteenth and final volume which is scheduled for Q2 2023.

Volume list

Anime

An anime television series adaptation was announced in the June issue of Monthly Shōnen Gangan magazine on May 11, 2019. The series is animated by Hoods Entertainment and directed by Takashi Naoya, with Tatsuya Takahashi handled the series composition, Kiyoshi Tateishi designed the characters, and TECHNOBOYS PULCRAFT GREEN-FUND composed the music. It aired from October 5 to December 21, 2019 on AT-X, Tokyo MX, SUN, and BS11. The series ran for 12 episodes. Rikako Aida performed the series' opening theme song "for...", while the nine Saotome sisters performed the series' ending theme song "Up-Date x Please!!!" in three groups with three versions. The series has been licensed by Sentai Filmworks and streamed it on Hidive.

References

External links
Val × Love at Monthly Shōnen Gangan 
 

Action anime and manga
Anime series based on manga
Fantasy anime and manga
Harem anime and manga
Fiction about monsters
Gangan Comics manga
Hoods Entertainment
Norse mythology in anime and manga
Sentai Filmworks
Shōnen manga
Yen Press titles